Çevlik is a village in the Başmakçı District, Afyonkarahisar Province, Turkey. Its population is 80 (2021). It is located southeast of Hırkaköy.

References

Villages in Başmakçı District